In nuclear physics, Ronen's golden rule for cluster radioactivity is that the most favorable parents for heavy ion emission (cluster radioactivity) are those that emit clusters which have atomic mass  which is given by . The daughter nuclei is preferably magic, close to the double magic 208Pb.

References 

1. ^Tavares, O.A.P., Roberto, L.A.M. and Medeiros, E.L., "Radioactive decay by the emission of heavy nuclear fragments". Phys. Scr. 76, 376, (2007).

Nuclear physics